is a city in Osaka Prefecture, Japan. It is a suburban city of Osaka City and a part of the Kyoto-Osaka-Kobe metropolitan area. Ibaraki translates to "wild trees" or "thorny trees". The city was incorporated on 1 January 1948. As of February 2017, the city has an estimated population of 280,562 and a population density of 3,580 persons per km2. The total area is 76.52 km2.

Transportation

Railways
West Japan Railway Company
JR Kyoto Line: Ibaraki Station–JR-Sōjiji Station
Hankyu Railway
Hankyu Kyoto Line: Minami-Ibaraki Station–Ibaraki-shi Station–Sōjiji Station
Osaka Monorail
Main Line: Unobe Station–Minami-Ibaraki Station–Sawaragi Station
Saito Line Handai-byōin-mae Station–Toyokawa Station–Saito-nishi Station

Highways

Education
Prefectural public senior high schools:
 
 
 
 
 
 

Private junior and senior high schools:
 
 
 
 Korea International School, a Korean international junior and senior high school, is in Ibaraki.

Private senior high schools:

Sister and friendship cities 
  Minneapolis, Minnesota, United States – Sister city agreement concluded in 1980
  Anqing, Anhui, China – Friendship city agreement concluded in 1985
  Shōdoshima, Kagawa, Japan – Sister city agreement concluded in 1988 (with former Uchinomi town)
  Taketa, Ōita, Japan – History cultural sister city agreement concluded in 2013

Notable people from Ibaraki, Osaka
 Ryota Hama, Japanese professional wrestler and retired sumo wrestler
 Satoshi Ishii, Japanese-Croatian judoka and mixed martial artist.
 Kusunoki Masashige, Japanese samurai of the Kamakura period
 Taiga Matsuo, professional Japanese baseball player
 Yasumichi Morita, interior designer
 Katagiri Katsumoto, Japanese warlord daimyō of the Azuchi–Momoyama period through early Edo period.
 Hiroyuki Onoue, Japanese actor
 Subaru Shibutani, Japanese singer, actor and lyricist (Kanjani Eight)
 Yu Shimasaki, former Japanese football player
 Chisato Moritaka, Japanese pop singer, songwriter and multi-instrumentalist
 Tatsuo Kamon, Japanese singer-songwriter
 Takaharu Nishino, Japanese football player
 Mizuki Ichimaru, Japanese football player
 Manabu Ikeda, former Japanese football player
 Sayaka Yamamoto, Japanese singer and songwriter (NMB48 and AKB48)
 Atsushi Kimura, former Japanese football player
 Shinichi Terada, Japanese football player
 Takuto Hayashi, Japanese football player
 Kenji Matsuda, Japanese actor
 Teruo Sugihara, Japanese professional golfer
 Yuta Nakatsuka, Japanese Dancer and actor (Generations from Exile Tribe)

References

External links

 Ibaraki city official website 

 
Cities in Osaka Prefecture